Acanthais is a genus of sea snails, marine gastropod mollusks in the family Muricidae, known as the murex snails or rock snails.

Species
Species within the genus Acanthais include:
 Acanthais brevidentata (Wood, 1828)

References

 
Rapaninae
Gastropod genera